Randy Louis Love (born September 30, 1956) is an American football former running back who played in the National Football League. He was selected in the 1st round (6th overall) of the 1979 NFL draft by the New England Patriots after playing college football for the University of Houston. He played seven seasons for the St. Louis Cardinals. He is now a Varsity Basketball Head Coach for the Garland Owls in Garland, Texas.

References

1956 births
Living people
Garland High School alumni
American football running backs
Houston Cougars football players
St. Louis Cardinals (football) players
People from Garland, Texas
Players of American football from Texas
Sportspeople from the Dallas–Fort Worth metroplex